The Serpent Prince or The Snake Prince is a Hungarian folk tale collected by Hungarian-American scholar Linda Dégh. It is classified in the international Aarne-Thompson-Uther Index as ATU 425A, "Animal as Bridegroom".

Sources
Dégh collected the tale in the 1950s from Hungarian teller Zsuzsanna Pálkó.

Summary
Pálkó's narration begins thus: a king complains to his wife that she has not born him any child. The queen questions why God has not given her children, and asks for a snake son, so that they may finally have offspring. Just as she says it, a snake son appears. The king declares they must hide the animal from prying eyes, so that no one may know they have a snake son.

They hide the animal son in a room and he grows up there. Years later, when he has grown very large, he begins to whistle so loud it shakes the castle. His mother pays him a visit to question what is the reson for the whistling. He explains he has come of age and desires a mate, and suggests the princess of a neighbouring kingdom shall be the perfect candidate.

So his mother summons the princess and she comes to the castle to find out more about her prospective husband. The queen leads the princess into the prince's quarters. When she sees the giant snake, she screams and faints. The queen sprinkles some water on her, who comes to, and explains the prince is the snake, albeit a harmless one. The princess refuses to marry the snake prince and tries to escape te room, whose windows are barred with iron. The queen and the king lock her up with the snake prince and leave them be.

This situation goes for a week: the princess tries to think of a way out, but everywhere she looks the windows and the doors are barred. She does not even touch her food, choosing to wither away slowly than marrying the snake. Despite his bride's grievances, the snake prince tries to convince the girl he means no harm to her. He then begins to crawl into their bridal bed, to the princess's horror. For two nights, she tries to sneak away from him, somewhat successfully.

The third night, after a quick rest, she wakes up to a handsome man beside her. She wakes the man up and question his presence there: he tells her he is the snake, but wears a snakeskin at night "because he has too", since it is his "cloak". The princess feels more at ease and they live as husband and wife, she becoming pregnant some time later.

Despite the revelation, the prince does not show his parents his human form, which annoys the princess. She visits a sorceress nearby and tells her her situation. The sorceress advises her to take the snakeskin and burn it in the stove.

That night, when the snake prince is asleep, the princess wakes up, takes the snakeskin off of him. She creeps into the kitchen, lights up the stove and tosses the skin in. She returns to her chambers to a awakened prince, who asks her about the smell of burning. She lies that it is only some tufts of her hair burning, but he knows she is lying. The prince then explains that he was to wear the cloak for one more month, and curses her not to bear their children until he embraces her again; and that a ring on her finger shall stay there until he puts his finger on her. He then gives her a dry hazel-rod she must water with her tears until it bears fruit, and a grain of wheat she must plant and with the harvest bake a bread; then she can go after him. Then he vanishes.

The princess tells her parents-in-law that the snake prince has disappeared, and goes to water the dry hazel-rod and the grain of wheat. After a long time, she takes the rod and the bread and starts a journey. In a forest, she sees a light in the distance - an old woman (the mother of the Moon)'s house, where she takes shelter for the night. Her son comes home and is inquired about the whereabouts of the Serpent Prince. The old woman directs the princess to her aunt, and gives her a gold bobbin.

The situation repeats twice in the next two houses (of the Sun and of the Winds), and she gains a golden reel and a golden spool and ball of thread; only on the third house she finally learns where her husband is: the Hurricane Wind tells her he went to his castle and he can take her there.

The princess arrives at the castle and wanders about with the gold bobbin. A maidservant appears and guides the girl to the queen, who is interested in the golden item and wishes to buy it. The princess offers it in exchange for a night in the king's chambers. She enters the chambers and begs her husband to awake and see her. She fails and weeps bitterly until dawn, when the queen expels her from the room. The second night goes much the same.

On the third day, the king's valet tells him that a woman has come to his chambers and wept at his bedside, but he could not respond. The king surmises he was drugged with a sleeping potion, and asks his valet to pour any drink he receives out in the bath. The princess sells her the golden thread, hoping she can wake him up. She enters the room and begs her husband to wake up and touch her breast. He does and she gives birth to their children: two golden-haired boys.

The queen enters the room, intending to expel the woman, but the king orders the guards to seize her and lock her up in a cell. The king summons his advisers, who counsel him that a wedded woman is better that an unwed one. He stays with the princess and his two sons, and punishes the queen.

Analysis

Tale type
The tale is classified in the Aarne-Thompson-Uther Index as type ATU 425A, "The Animal (Monster) as Bridegroom". In this tale type, the princess burns the husband's animal skin and she must seek him out, even paying a visit to the Sun, the Moon and the Wind and gaining their help. In tale type ATU 425A, the heroine journeys far and wide to encounter her husband, and finds him at the mercy of a second spouse. The supernatural husband, now human, is put to sleep by the magic potion of the second spouse, so that the heroine has no chance of rescuing him.

Others of this type include The Black Bull of Norroway, The Brown Bear of Norway, The Daughter of the Skies, East of the Sun and West of the Moon, The Tale of the Hoodie, The Sprig of Rosemary, and White-Bear-King-Valemon.

Similarly, the Hungarian Folktale Catalogue (MNK) indexes it as type AaTh 425A, Ámor és Psükhé ("Amor and Psyche"): the heroine marries an animal husband that is human underneath the animal skin, burns the animal skin, and loses him; to get him back, she travels to the houses of the Mother of the Sun, the Mother of the Moon and the Mother of the Wind, and gains objects she uses to bribe the false bride for a night with her husband.

Motifs

The heroine's helpers 
According to Hans-Jörg Uther, the main feature of tale type ATU 425A is "bribing the false bride for three nights with the husband". In fact, when he developed his revision of Aarne-Thompson's system, Uther remarked that an "essential" trait of the tale type ATU 425A was the "wife's quest and gifts" and "nights bought".

In a study published posthumously, Romanian folklorist  noted that, in Romanian and in some South Slavic variants, instead of meeting the Sun, the Moon and the Wind on the way to her husband, the heroine finds incarnations of the days of the week, like Holy Wednesday and Holy Friday. They function the same as the elements and gift the heroine with golden objects.

The heroine's pregnancy 
In Balkanic variants of the tale type, the supernatural husband curses his wife not to give birth to their child for a long period of time until she finds him again. In addition, according to Lithuanian professor , similar tales from Hungary, Romania and Moldova contain the motif of the supernatural husband wrapping iron hoops around the heroine's belly so she cannot give birth to their child until he lays a hand on her again.

In this regard, Hungarian scholar Ákos Dömötör, in the 1988 revised edition of the Hungarian Folktale Catalogue, separated this motif under a second typing indexed as AaTh 425L, Abroncs a Testen ("Rings on Body"): the husband places iron rings around the heroine's body so she is unable to give birth until he touches her again. Despite its own typing, Dömötör remarked that it is "identical" to type AaTh 425A (see above).

Interpretations
Linda Dégh also saw a sexual component in the character of the snake bridegroom in the Hungarian variants. In the same vein, researcher Donald Ward observed an erotic element "in almost every variant" of the tale type: the defloration of a virgin by a phallic-shaped monster.

Dégh also remarked that these tales refer to a patriarchal peasant order: the preference for a male firstborn; the arranged marriage for women; the double marriage of the male character.

Variants
According to Hungarian scholarship, ethnographer  dubbed type AaTh 425A in Hungary as Kígyóvőlegény ("The Serpent Bridegroom"), due to the serpent appearing in 12 of 26 variants available in his lifetime.

Dégh stated that she analysed some 40 Hungarian variants of type ATU 425A and concluded that the "Hungarian ethnic redaction" of the type "always" featured the snake as the supernatural husband. In a later study, Dégh claimed that the Hungarian ethnic redaction was "remarkably consistent": the snake is the animal bridegroom "in all cases", barring a few variants wherein the supernatural bridegroom is a pig or a dog.

Dégh located the first recorded variant in Hungary in 1822.

Regional tales
One day, an old woman brings a bouquet of flowers that the queen smells. She becomes pregnant and gives birth to a snake. They decide to keep it alive instead of killing it. Years later, the snake whistles from a tree. The king wonders why, but the old woman explains the snake wants to be married. The royal couple finds him a princess that he soon kills. They find later him a poor peasant girl from that town whom he marries and treats kindly. The girl notices her husband takes off the snakeskin at night and becomes a handsome prince. The queen mother learns of this through her daughter-in-law steals the snakeskin and burns it in the oven. The snake prince wakes up, realizes the situation and curses his wife not to give birth until he puts his hand on her. He vanishes to the Fairy Realm and marries the Fairy Queen. Meanwhile, his human wife decides to go after him. She passes by the King of the Winds, the Castle of Moon and the Castle of the Day, and gains a golden spindle, a golden spinning wheel and a third golden instrument. She reaches the palace of the Fairy Queen and trades the golden objects for three nights with her husband. The human wife begs for her husband to let her give birth to their golden-haired child.

In Hungarian variant A kigyóbör (Die Schlangenhaut or "The Snakeskin"), collected by László Merényi and translated by Elisabeth Rona-Sklárek, a poor woman prays to God for a son, even if it is a half-man, half-snake child. Thus she bears a son as she described. Eighteen years pass, the snake son grows and talks to his mother that he want to marry the local king's daughter, she who is famed for her beauty. His mother goes to the king to tell him of her son's proposal, and the king wants as a wedding gift a basket of gem-made flowers and golden apples. The poor mother returns to her poor hut and tells her son about it. The son asks his mother to wait outside, takes off his snakeskin and shakes it seven times: magical servants appear to get the requested items. The mother delivers the basket to the princess and her father asks for a golden bridge to be built overnight between both their houses - which is also accomplished. That night, the princess dreams of a handsome man on her bed, and, when she wakes up, she finds a strand of golden hair and a golden scale on her bed. The king consents to their marriage, but they have to wait three days. The snake son uses this time to summon his magical servants to prepare the couple's castle, a wedding retinue for his bride, a magnificent bride's dress and a splendid carriage. After they marry, the snake husband takes off his skin, becomes a man and tells his human bride his secret: he truly is a human man underneath the snakeskin. Some time later, the princess is pregnant and tells her mother his secret, and the queen convinces her to burn the snakeskin. She follows through with the instructions and tosses the snakeskin into the oven. As the snakeskin burns, the magical servants also burn with it, and sing a lament before disappearing. The snake husband notices the loss of the snakeskin and curses his wife not to give birth until he embraces her again. In return, she curses him that three drops of her spilled blood, staining his white shirt, will not be washed save by her own hands. The husbands then vanishes in a puff of smoke. Seven years, seven monts, seven days pass, and the princess goes on a quest for her husband: she passes by the houses of the Mother of the Moon, the Mother of the Sun, the Mother of the Wind, and gains two goldfishes, a golden cup and two golden spindles, and lastly a golden yarn. The princess takes a ride on the back of the Wind and goes to the palace of the false bride. The princess washes her husband's bloodied shirt in the lake. Her husband puts his hand on her breast and she gives birth to their children: a pair of golden-haired twins, a boy and a girl, one with the sun, the other with a star on the front.

In a Yugoslavian-Hungarian variant titled A kígyó-vőlegény ("The Snake-Groom"), a poor couple wishes for a son and a snake is born. Time passes, and the snake whistles for his mother. The woman talks to her son and he says he wishes to be married. He sets his eyes on a neighbouring girls. They invite the first girl: she enters the bedroom, sees the snake and screams; the snake coils around her neck and strangles her. The same thing happens to a second girl. When it is time for a third candidate, the girl caresses the snake and survives the ordeal. She discovers the snake is a handsome man at night and wears the snakeskin during the day. Her mother-in-law convinces the girl to burn the skin. She prepares the oven with some hot coals and throws the skin in the fire. The snake son wakes up and admonishes his wife, and curses her to not give birth and for her ring to stick to her finger until she has found him in a black castle in the north. He vanishes and she goes after him, passing by the house of three old women and gaining golden objects: the Sun and his mother (who gives her a golden spinning wheel), the Moon and his mother (who gives her a golden "viszálló" or spindle), and the Whirlwind ("forgószél", in the original) and his mother (who gives her a golden bobbin). Still in the third house, the old woman asks her son to help the girl reach the black castle up north in no time. At last she arrives at the castle of the fairy queen, where she sees launderesses trying to wash a bloodied shirt. The pregnant girl manages to do it when the other women failed, and a maidservant reports to the fairy queen about her presence. She is brought to the monarch's court room and trades the golden objects for three nights with her husband. She sits by his bedside and begs him to wake up and touch her. He does on her third attempt and at last she gives birth to their child. The next day, the fairy princess and her court disappear from the castle.

Hungarian linguist  collected the tale A sárig kicsi kígyó ("A small snake from the mud"), a poor couple does not have any children. One morning, the wife tells her husband about a dream she had: in her dream, an old man says they have to stand outside the house and get the first animal that passes by them as their son. The man stays outside and takes a small snake as their son. One day, the snake tells their parents he wants a bride, and says he wants the king's daughter as his wife. The snake's father goes to the king and make a bid for his daughter. The king agrees, but orders three tasks before he allows the marriage: first, he wants three golden apples from the garden of Tündér Ilona (Fairy Ilona); next, to build a palace in place of their poor hut; and finally to connect both palaces with a golden bridge and a golden chain, with golden birds singing alongside it. The snake fulfills all tasks and weds the princess, who cries over her marriage with the snake. However, on the wedding night, the snake slithers to the princess's room and takes off the snakeskin, becoming a man. He explains his father cursed him to wear a snakeskin for seven years, seven months and seven days, and that the secret must stay between them. The next morning, the princess tells her mother that her snake husband is a man. The queen orders an old maidservant to hide in the couple's room at night and steal the snakeskin. The maidservant obeys the queen's orders. The prince awakens the next day and sees that the snakeskin is nowhere to be seen. He tells his wife they need to separate, ties a golden ring around her belly, and tells her to go to his kingdom, stand outside his window and shout at him for seven days and seven nights - the remaining time of his curse. The princess follows him to his father's kingdom, stays under his window and shouts for him to come take off the golden ring around her belly. The curse is lifted and the princess and prince live happily.

In a tale collected from teller János Puji, in Marosszentkirály (Sâncraiu de Mureș) by ethnographer Olga Nagy (hu), titled A rest léany ("The Lazy Girl"), an old woman has a daughter that is so very lazy. One day, fed up with the girl's behaviour, curses that a dog shall take the girl for wife. The same night, a dog knocks on the woman's door and comes to collect the girl as his wife. The woman gives her daughter to the dog and they leave for the dog's castle. When night comes, the dog takes off the dogskin and becomes human, and wears the dogskin by day. Time passes, the girl asks the dog to visit her mother. The dog agrees, but warns him to say nothing to her mother. The girl is taken to her mother's house and tells that her husband becomes a man at night by taking off the dogskin. The woman, then, advises the girl to place some hot coals by the bed, so that her husband kicks off the dogskin and it falls on the coals. The girl goes home and follows her instructions; the dogskin begins to burn and the husband wakes up. He complains that he only had to wear the skin for another 9 days, and curses his wife not to give birth until he embraces her again. The girl returns to her mother's house and explains the situation. She commissions a pair of iron rings from a blacksmith and begins her quest. She reaches the house of the Holy Friday and takes shelter with her. Holy Friday is sorry she cannot help the girl, but gives her a golden spindle and directs her to the house of Holy Saturday. The girl next passes by the house of Holy Saturday, who also cannot help her but give her a golden bundle and directs her to the house of Holy Sunday. At last, Holy Sunday can provide further help: she gives the girl a chicken with 12 golden chicks, and tells her to go to the castle just before the end of the world; use the golden gifts to draw the attention of the empress. Following her advice, the girl takes out each of the golden gifts; the empress sends her maidservant to ask the strange girl the price for the gifts: one night with the emperor in his chambers. The girl spends two nights, but is not able to wake him, only on the third night. The girl's husband wakes and places her hand on his wife; she gives birth to twins, a golden-haired boy and a golden-haired girl, each with a golden apple on hand.

Antal Hoger collected the tale Az agárbőrös királyfi és felesége ("The Greyhound Prince and his Wife"), a woman has no sons and prays to God to have one, even if it is a hound. So, she gives birth to a puppy, which grows into a hound and demands from his mother a bride. The woman questions his son's decision, and the animal tells her he knows of a king with three daughters. The woman takes the elder princess to him, but she utters she will treat him like a dog, and the hound kills her. The same happens to the middle princess. When it is the youngest's turn, she says she will treat him like a king's son, and the hound takes her as his wife. Some time later, the woman asks her daughter-in-law about the hound son, and the princess tells him he is beautiful underneath, and both conspire to burn the dogskin. One night, the princess takes the dogskin and burns it. The hound prince smells the burning, but the princess dismisses it as just burnt food. The next day, the human hound prince bedecks his wife with ten golden rings on her fingers, a silver girdle around her belly, and a pair of silk footwear. He then curses her not to take off the jewels and not to give birth to their children (a pair of golden-haired twins) until she finds him again and he places his hand on her. He vanishes. She goes after him with an iron cane. She goes to the Mother of the Moon, who gives her a golden distaff. Next, she goes to the Mother of the Sun, who gives her a golden spindle. Lastly, she pays a visit to the Mother of the Wind, who gives her a golden matollát and directs her to a nearby village, where her husband is. The Wind also advises her to go to the village gates and draw out the golden objecs to attract the attention of her husband's second spouse. The princess follows the Wind's advice and uses the golden gifts to bribe the second spouse for three nights with her husband. She fails twice, because the human greyhound is fast asleep, due to a sleeping draught given to him. On the third time, the prince pretends to be asleep so he can listen to the woman crying in his room, and wakes up. He touches his wife and she gives birth to their golden-haired twins.

In a tale collected from teller Matild Horváth with the title Az elátkozott leány ("The Cursed Maiden"), a girl goes to fetch water for her father and goes to a well, but she is stopped by an ugly frog that demands to sleep on her bed in exchange for allowing access to the water. She goes back home with the water and lets the frog sleep on her bed, but, to her surprise, the frog takes off its skin to become a handsome youth. The next evening, while they go to sleep, the neighbours take the frogskin and burn it. The morning after, as soon as the human frog wakes up and does not see the amphibian skin, he curses the girl not to give birth to any child for seven years, until he places three fingers on her and a golden circle around her. He also tells her to find him where the herbs sing and dance, then vanishes. After seven years of a long journey, she finds God, who gives her a golden key and a golden locket. The girl then arrives at the well of her husband, which the story names Király Dávid ("King David"), and asks for a bit of water, since she has not drunk anything in seven years. She then gives the cook the golden objects to allow access to her husband, King Dávid, so he can touch her. The cook, however, receives the golden objects, but gives a plate with sleeping potion to King Dávid and he is asleep when the girl tries to wake him up. On the third time, King Dávid does not eat the food the cook prepared and touches his wife's belly, so she can give birth to their child. The cook is then punished.

See also
Tales about serpent husbands:
 The Enchanted Snake
 The Green Serpent
 Tulisa, the Wood-Cutter's Daughter
 Khastakhumar and Bibinagar
 Habrmani
 King Lindworm
 Eglė the Queen of Serpents
Princess Himal and Nagaray
The Snake Prince
Monyohe (Sotho)
Umamba (Zulu folktale)
Baemsillang (The Serpent Husband)
Amewakahiko soshi
 Yasmin and the Serpent Prince
 Champavati
 The King of the Snakes

References 

Hungarian fairy tales
Fictional snakes
Fiction about shapeshifting
Male characters in fairy tales
Fictional princes
ATU 400-459